Giulia Perelli (1897 – 1964) was an Italian tennis player. She competed in the women's singles event at the 1924 Summer Olympics.

References

External links
 

1897 births
1964 deaths
Italian female tennis players
Olympic tennis players of Italy
Tennis players at the 1924 Summer Olympics
Tennis players from Milan